Homey may refer to:
 Homey (album), album by the American band Chon
 Homey (smart hub), device manufactured by the Dutch company Athom
 Homey Airport, US military facility more commonly known as Area 51
 Homey D. Clown, character from In Living Color

See also
 Homi (disambiguation)
 Homie (disambiguation)